Propostira quadrangulata, is a species of spider of the genus Propostira. It is native to India and Sri Lanka.

See also
 List of Theridiidae species

References

Theridiidae
Arthropods of Sri Lanka
Spiders of Asia
Spiders described in 1894